Cnaphalocrocis hemicrossa is a moth in the family Crambidae. It was described by Edward Meyrick in 1887. It is found in Tahiti.

References

Moths described in 1887
Spilomelinae